Järbo is a locality situated in Sandviken Municipality, Gävleborg County, Sweden with 1,801 inhabitants in 2010.

Sports
The following sports clubs are located in Järbo:

 Järbo IF

References 

Populated places in Sandviken Municipality
Gästrikland